The men's 400 metre freestyle at the 2014 IPC Swimming European Championships was held at the Pieter van den Hoogenband Swimming Stadium in Eindhoven from 4–10 August.

Medalists

See also
List of IPC world records in swimming

References

freestyle 400 m men